Michelle Huneven (born August 14, 1953) is an American novelist and journalist. Huneven was born and raised in a Jewish family in Altadena, California, where she returned to live in 2001. She received an MFA from the Iowa Writers' Workshop at the University of Iowa and attended the Methodist Claremont School of Theology.  She now attends Neighborhood Unitarian Universalist Church in Pasadena, California.

Fiction 
Huneven’s novels explore related themes of recovery and maturation. Her first novel, Round Rock (Knopf 1997), follows a graduate student's reluctant path to sobriety at a drunk farm in rural California. Jamesland (Knopf 2003) is set in the Los Feliz neighborhood of Los Angeles, where three struggling souls—a Unitarian minister, a descendant of William James, and an erstwhile chef—help each other learn to get by. Both novels were designated "Notable Books of the Year" by The New York Times.

Her third novel, Blame (2009), was a finalist for the National Book Critics Circle Award for fiction. It portrays the journey of a young history professor after accidentally killing two people while driving drunk. Her fourth novel, Off Course, was published in April 2014 by Farrar, Straus and Giroux.

Huneven's fifth novel, Search came out in April 2022 and tells the story of a Unitarian Universalist church's search for a new minister.  The narrator is a restaurant reviewer and former seminarian, who joins the search committee in the interest of writing a memoir, ultimately called Search.

Huneven's short fiction has been published in Harper's, Redbook, and literary magazines. She received a Whiting Award in 2002.

Food writing and other nonfiction 
Huneven has worked as a restaurant critic and food writer for the LA Weekly and the LA Times. Her food journalism has also been published in The New York Times, O, Gourmet, Food and Wine, and other publications. She won the 1995 award for Newspaper Feature Writing from the James Beard Foundation and several American Food Journalists awards.

Huneven co-authored the Tao Gals’ Guide to Real Estate (Bloomsbury 2006), a combination narrative and guidebook for women purchasing homes. Her essays have appeared in the following anthologies: Horse People, Dog is My Co-Pilot, The Knitter's Gift, Death by Pad Thai, and Mr. Wrong.

She teaches creative writing at UCLA.

References

Further reading 
 Penelope Green, “Our Equity, Ourselves”, The New York Times, January 26, 2006
 Bernadette Murphy, “Life’s answers: Is religion in the mix?”, Los Angeles Times, September 21, 2003
 "Michelle Huneven", Random House Website
 "Interview: Michelle Huneven", The LAist, 7 Mar 2005

External links 
 Michelle Huneven's website
Profile at The Whiting Foundation

1953 births
Living people
People from Altadena, California
20th-century American novelists
Iowa Writers' Workshop alumni
University of California, Los Angeles faculty
21st-century American novelists
Jewish American journalists
American women novelists
20th-century American women writers
21st-century American women writers
Novelists from California
James Beard Foundation Award winners
American women non-fiction writers
20th-century American non-fiction writers
21st-century American non-fiction writers
21st-century American Jews
O. Henry Award winners
American Unitarian Universalists